Willow Vale is a small town in New South Wales, Australia, in the Municipality of Kiama. It is made up of residences, dairy farms, and more recently the Crooked River Winery.

It is adjacent to the town of Gerringong, New South Wales on the South Coast and can be accessed from the Princes Highway.

Its highest point is higher than 100 m above sea level.

References

Towns in New South Wales
Municipality of Kiama